The International Institute For Peace (IIP) was established in Vienna, Austria, in 1956 to conduct research on peace and promote the peaceful resolution of conflict. Operating globally alongside organizations like the Economic and Social Council of the United Nations (ECOSOC) and United Nations Organization for Education, Science, Culture and Communication (UNESCO), the IIP implements peaceful practices across nations.

History 
The International Institute for Peace was founded in Vienna in 1956. In 1989, Erwin Lanc re-founded the institute as a non-governmental organization and introduced new statutes. Since 1989, the IIP has been, according to Austrian Law, independent of any state. It has consultative status at the Economic and Social Council of the United Nations (ECOSOC) and the United Nations Organization for Education, Science, Culture, and Communication (UNESCO). The current president is Dr. Hannes Swoboda.

About 

The International Institute for Peace (IIP) is an international Non-Governmental Organization (NGO) that gained consultative status with UNESCO in 2011.  IIP and UNESCO work together to address any violence that takes place in the world, mainly in areas of high population. Cases are analyzed, and members of IIP and UNESCO attempt to find a peaceful resolution to the situation. IIP's work helps UNESCO meet its constitutional goal of building peace in the minds of people.
 
The IIP efforts include:  

 incorporating peace-building practices into various aspects such as art, climate change, and the environment  
 provide mediation efforts for those who are in very stressful/violent situations (such as war)  
 building a global platform that people can access in order to help create peaceful societies

The art, climate change, and environmental aspects are different ways for people to see and understand the importance of peace in a creative way and or emphasize peace in a way that is understandable. Mediation efforts are a way for the institute to suggest and or provide ways for people to practice peace. 

The IIP collaborates with state governments, international organizations, businesses, and civil society organizations in various countries. The organization specializes in areas such as politics, peace research and conflict resolution. This international organization focuses on promoting peaceful solutions to people in a wide variety of places. International outreaches in collaboration with other NGOs and IGOs are part of the action plan, specifically in Africa, North America and South America. Research is something that the IIP focuses on all around the world, including Austria, which is where the IIP is founded and based. The institute also looks at some findings which are based on how is the effectiveness of conflict resolutions on the economy and society. Their findings look at all of these things combined because they all play a significant role when it comes to peace.

References

Peace organisations based in Austria
World Peace Council
Organizations established in 1956
Organizations established in 1989
1956 establishments in Austria
1989 establishments in Austria

External link 

 International Institute for Peace